Garden in Transit was a public art exhibit displayed on New York City taxicabs between September 2007 and December 2007. Adhesive, weatherproof paintings of flowers painted by children in schools and hospitals were applied to the exteriors of New York City taxicabs. The paintings were mostly made by New York City children, with some being made by children in New Jersey, Philadelphia, Atlanta, Cleveland, and Los Angeles. The project was organized by Ed and Bernie Massey.

The 'Flower Taxis' are part of a series of public art projects that the Masseys have done with children in their Portraits of Hope project since its founding in 1995.  Each of the projects has a corporate sponsor.  Its other large-scale projects include:
The Tower of Hope in Sweden in 2000
Soaring Dreams Airship – a blimp in 2005
Soaring Dreams – NASCAR cars in 2006
Chelsea Piers Project at Chelsea Piers
Control Tower Paneling  the  Long Beach Airport  Control Tower in 2007

Notes

External links
Official Project Site

Art vehicles
Public art in New York City
Taxis of the United States
Types of garden
2007 works